Falhi Sikunthu is a two-part Maldivian comedy short film series produced by Mohamed Abdulla under Mai Dream Entertainments. The first installment of the series, written by Abdullah and directed by Amjad Ibrahim was released in 2004. The second installment, a standalone short film from its prequel, written by Ibrahim Rasheed and directed by Ravee Farooq was released in 2005.

List of productions

Premise

Falhi Sikunthu 1
Muhamma (Mohamed Abdulla), an old-fashioned, short-tempered man, visits Male' and problems follow with him from bumping on random people walking by. On his way to his friend's home, he spots a gorgeous poster woman, Mariyam (Sheereen Abdul Wahid) where he falls in love with at first sight. His friend, Habeeb (Hussain Nooradeen) advises him to undergo a full makeover and wear modern attire, if he insists to win her heart. He goes from door-to-door asking for her whereabouts where he meets her father, who warns him to stay away from his daughter. Soon, he becomes shortly distracted after seeing another woman (Waleedha). This does not stop Muhamma from his hunt for Mariyam though Habeeb recommends him to go back to his island and return after performing black magic to win her love.

Falhi Sikunthu 2
Fathuhiyya, who got pregnant forty years later goes into an unusual labor during her eleventh month of pregnancy. The newborn child grows up to an adult, Muhamma (Mohamed Abdulla), within a fraction of few seconds, who seems to be possessed by Michael Jackson. A song later it is revealed that Muhamma has a body of an adult but a mind of five years' child. However, when it comes to women, Muhamma has a very mature mind and is incontrollable with his feelings and desires.

Cast 
Falhi Sikunthu 1
 Mohamed Abdulla as Muhamma
 Sheereen Abdul Wahid as Mariyam
 Ahmed Shaz as Aadhanu; a chef / a physics teacher
 Hussain Nooradeen as Habeeb
 Nazim
 Sameema
 Hussain Shibau
 Nafiu Saleem
 Nadhiya Hassan (special appearance in the song "Meheboob Magey")
 Ahmed Ziya (special appearance in the song "Meheboob Magey")
 Waleedha (special appearance in the song "Manjey Bunedhee")

''Falhi Sikunthu'' 2
 Mohamed Abdulla as Muhamma
 Zeenath Abbas as Athika
 Ibrahim Naseer as Siraj
 Aishath Siyadha as Rizna aunty
 Mariyam Haleem as Athika's mother
 Ahmed Nimal as Ziyazor
 Ahmed Shah as doctor
 Niuma Mohamed as a nurse
 Ali Farooq as Athika's father
 Ravee Farooq (special appearance in the song "Sissaali Dhanvaru")
 Mumthaz Moosa (special appearance in the song "Inthizaaruge Guitar")

Soundtrack

Accolades

References

Short film series
Maldivian short films
Films directed by Amjad Ibrahim